Final league standings for the 1907-08 St. Louis Soccer League.

League standings

References
St. Louis Soccer Leagues (RSSSF)

1907-08
1907–08 domestic association football leagues
1907–08 in American soccer
St Louis Soccer
St Louis Soccer